Diving was contested at the 1966 Asian Games in Wisutamol Swimming Pool, Bangkok, Thailand from December 13 to December 16, 1966.

Medalists

Men

Women

Medal table

References 

 The Straits Times, December 14–17, 1966

External links
Medals

 
1966 Asian Games events
1966
Asian Games
1966 Asian Games